KA Commuter line Cikarang Loop Line, formerly Bekasi Line and Cikarang line, is a commuter rail line in Indonesia, operated by PT Kereta Commuter Indonesia (KCI). The line connects Kampung Bandan station in North Jakarta and Cikarang station in Cikarang, Bekasi Regency, West Java. On maps and diagrams, the line is shown using the color "blue". Jakarta Kota–Cikarang is the extension of previously Jakarta Kota–Bekasi line which connects to Cikarang since 8 October 2017.

As of 2015, the line is the third-busiest line in the KA Commuter system, after red line and yellow line.

Before 28 May 2022, there used to be two routes operating between Jakarta Kota and Bekasi. One serves via Manggarai and other one via Pasar Senen. Line and stations between Jakarta Kota and Manggarai were shared with the Jakarta Kota–Bogor line.

KAI Commuter announced in 21 May 2022 that the line will be renamed as Cikarang Loop Line with new abbreviation (C) by 28 May 2022, as part of Manggarai station upgrade. The line ceased operating to Jakarta Kota. Trains from Bekasi or Cikarang arriving at Jatinegara now continue through city loop previously used by Loop Line, clockwise or counterclockwise, and then return to Bekasi or Cikarang. Several trains end their journey at Angke or Kampung Bandan without looping. In response to passenger congestion at Manggarai, a feeder service serving Manggarai-Angke/Kampung Bandan portion of the line was introduced on 30 May 2022 to minimise waiting time.

Stations

Rolling stock 
 Ex-Tokyu 8000 series (2005-present)
 Ex-Tokyu 8500 series (2006-present)
 Ex-JR East 203 series (2011–present)
 Ex-JR East 205 series (2013–present)
 Ex-Tokyo Metro 6000 series (2011-present)

Past rolling stock
 Ex-JR East 103 series (2004–2016)
 Ex-Tokyo Metro 7000 series (2010–2019)
 Ex-Tokyo Metro 05 series (2010–2019)
 Ex-Toyo Rapid 1000 series (2007–2019)
 Ex-Tokyo Metro 5000 series (2007–2020)

Accidents and incidents

Pre-2011 route and services reform 

 On 27 June 1928, a Westinghouse EMU of the State Electric Railway (then still under Dutch East Indies colonial rule) from the direction of Kemayoran station overran the terminating tracks of Batavia Noord station, hitting a horse drawn carriage on the road beside the station. No human casualty reported 
On 18 July 2007, a KRL Holec train trainset no. KL3-97228F running KA 423 (Economy) bound for Jakarta Kota was hit from behind by a locomotive being sent to Pasar Senen to carry KA 120 Jayabaya while stopping at Pondokjati station. No injury reported. The KRL set was able to continue its journey without further incident. 
On 30 October 2008,  a former Toei 6000 set number 6181F train bound for Jakarta Kota via Pasar Senen variant of the line (at the time being the main route for this line) as KA 421 AC Economy class train was hit from behind by Antaboga 1001 freight train on a track segment between Kemayoran and Kampung Bandan stations.

References

External links
 KRL Jabotabek website  
 Jabotabek Railnews 
 KRL Jabodetabek 
 KRL-Mania – KRL Jabotabek community site 

Jakarta
Infrastructure in Indonesia
Transport in Jakarta
Transport in West Java
Railway loop lines